Coffeeae is a tribe of flowering plants in the family Rubiaceae and contains about 333 species in 11 genera. Its representatives are found in tropical and southern Africa, Madagascar, the western Indian Ocean, tropical and subtropical Asia, and Queensland.

Genera 
Currently accepted names

 Argocoffeopsis Lebrun (8 sp)
 Belonophora Hook.f. (5 sp)
 Calycosiphonia Pierre ex Robbr. (2 sp)
 Coffea L. (137 sp)
 Diplospora DC. (23 sp)
 Discospermum Dalzell (13 sp)
 Empogona Hook.f. (30 sp)
 Kupeantha Cheek (6 sp)
 Nostolachma T.Durand (6 sp)
 Sericanthe Robbr. (22 sp)
 Tricalysia A.Rich. ex DC. (81 sp)

Synonyms

 Argocoffea  = Argocoffeopsis
 Bunburya  = Tricalysia
 Buseria  = Coffea
 Cafe  = Coffea
 Cofeanthus  = Coffea
 Diplocrater  = Tricalysia
 Diplosporopsis  = Belonophora
 Discocoffea  = Tricalysia
 Eriostoma  = Tricalysia
 Hexepta  = Coffea
 Hymendocarpum  = Nostolachma
 Kerstingia  = Belonophora
 Lachnastoma  = Nostolachma
 Leiochilus  = Coffea
 Natalanthe  = Tricalysia
 Neorosea  = Tricalysia
 Nescidia  = Coffea
 Paolia  = Coffea
 Paracoffea  = Coffea
 Pleurocoffea  = Coffea
 Probletostemon  = Tricalysia
 Psilanthopsis  = Coffea
 Psilanthus  = Coffea
 Rosea  = Tricalysia
 Solenixora  = Coffea
 Xantonnea  = Discospermum

References 

 
Ixoroideae tribes